Manuel Nájera Siller (born 20 December 1952) is a Mexican former football defender who played for Mexico in the 1978 FIFA World Cup. He also played for Club Universidad de Guadalajara.

References

External links
 
FIFA profile

1952 births
Mexico international footballers
Association football defenders
Leones Negros UdeG footballers
Liga MX players
1978 FIFA World Cup players
CONCACAF Championship-winning players
Footballers from Morelos
People from Cuautla
Living people
Mexican footballers